The shelling was an attack on a Cai Lậy District government-controlled schoolyard in South Vietnam on 30 August 1973, by the Republic of Vietnam Military Forces. The shelling was centered on the districts of Cái Bè and Cai Lậy, areas of traditional VC control in Định Tường Province in the northern delta.

It was an Artillery Bombardment on an Elementary school in Cai Lậy town, Định Tường province, Vietnam in 1974 that the US Government called "the terrorist campaign of the Democratic Republic of Viet Nam" shelling an elementary school in Cai Lay on 9 March. According to the United States, 32 students were killed and 55 others injured.

After that, the Provisional Revolutionary Government of the Republic of South Vietnam and the South Vietnam blamed each other.

References 

1973 in Vietnam
Collective punishment
Mass murder in 1973
Massacres in Vietnam
War crimes in Vietnam
August 1973 events
Terrorism in Vietnam
History of Tiền Giang Province
School massacres in Asia
Vietnam War crimes by the Viet Cong